Alexandria is the debut album by English musician Adrian Borland, credited to Adrian Borland & the Citizens. It was released in 1989 by record label Play It Again Sam.

Reception 

In its retrospective review, Trouser Press wrote: "Borland's subsequent solo career got off to a good start with Alexandria, as he brings a variety of moods to the alternately austere, sensuous and lighthearted pop, revealing a mild Velvet Underground influence."

Track listing

References 

1989 debut albums
Adrian Borland albums